Sida is a district (amphoe) in the northeastern part of Nakhon Ratchasima province, northeastern Thailand.

History
The area of Sida was separated from Bua Yai district and made a minor district on 1 July 1997. On 15 May 2007, all 81 minor districts were upgraded to full districts. On 24 August the upgrade became official.

Geography
Neighbouring districts are (from the north clockwise): Bua Lai, Prathai, Non Daeng, and Bua Yai.

Administration
The district is divided into five subdistricts (tambons), which are further subdivided into 50 villages (mubans). Sida is also the only township (thesaban tambon) and covers parts of tambons Sida, Phon Thong, and Sam Mueang.

References

External links
amphoe.com

Sida